Praying with Anger is a 1992 independent drama film directed by M. Night Shyamalan, who made his directorial debut. Shyamalan also wrote, produced, and starred in the film.

It is about a young Indian American's return to India and explores the clash of Western values with those of the Indian subcontinent.

Plot
Indian American Dev Raman returns to his native country to spend a year as part of a college exchange program. He is initially reluctant, but his mother insists, and he respects her wishes. While there, he discovers that his cold and distant father, now deceased, carried a quiet and profound affection towards him.

While he is in India, he receives guidance from his friend Sanjay. As the visit progresses, Dev ignores Sanjay's suggestions, and the interaction between Indian and Western cultures quickly precipitates into misunderstanding and violence.

Dev realizes that one may pray to the deities of the Hindu pantheon in almost any emotional state except indifference. As he explores his past and sees the miscommunication between the two cultures, Dev is overwhelmed and finds himself only able to pray with anger.

Release
The film never received a wide release for mainstream distribution and has been shown primarily at film festivals. Praying with Anger screened at the 1993 AFI Fest, where it won the "First Film Competition" for American independent filmmakers.

Cast and characters
 M. Night Shyamalan as Dev Raman
 Mike Muthu as Sanjay
 Richa Ahuja as Rupal Mohan
 Sushma Ahuja as Mrs. Mohan
 Arun Balachandran as Raj Kahn
 Christabal Howie as Sabitha

References

External links
 

1992 films
Indian drama films
Films about Indian Americans
Asian-American drama films
Indian diaspora in the United States
Films directed by M. Night Shyamalan
Films produced by M. Night Shyamalan
Films with screenplays by M. Night Shyamalan
1992 directorial debut films
American drama films
Films set in India
American independent films
1992 independent films
1990s English-language films
1990s American films